Los Palacios is a Spanish geographical indication for Vino de la Tierra wines located in the autonomous region of Andalusia. Vino de la Tierra is one step below the mainstream Denominación de Origen indication on the Spanish wine quality ladder.

The area covered by this geographical indication comprises the municipalities of Los Palacios y Villafranca, Utrera, Dos Hermanas and Alcalá de Guadaira, in the province of Seville, (Andalusia, Spain). 

It acquired its Vino de la Tierra status in 2003.

Grape varieties
 White: Airén, Colombard and Sauvignon blanc

References

Spanish wine
Wine regions of Spain
Wine-related lists
Appellations